Whiplash Smile is the third studio album by English rock singer Billy Idol, released on 20 October 1986 by Chrysalis Records. After his successful album Rebel Yell (1983), Idol continued his collaboration with producer Keith Forsey and guitarist Steve Stevens while writing and producing songs for the album. The album utilizes Stevens' characteristic guitar work, dance beats, and synth-heavy production.

Whiplash Smile received generally mixed reviews from music critics. Commercially the album noted a success similar to his previous album, as it peaked at number six on the US Billboard 200. The album reached number eight in the United Kingdom, and also peaked inside the top ten in many other countries, such as Australia, Canada, Germany, New Zealand, and Switzerland. Whiplash Smile was certified platinum by the Recording Industry Association of America (RIAA) and has sold more than two million copies worldwide.

Three singles were released from the album, with "To Be a Lover", "Don't Need a Gun" and "Sweet Sixteen" peaking into the top forty on the Billboard Hot 100. "Soul Standing By" was released as a single only in Australia and New Zealand.

Track listing

Personnel 
Credits adapted from the album liner notes.

 Billy Idol – vocals, guitars, bass
 Steve Stevens – keyboards, programming, guitars, bass 
 Phillip Ashley – keyboards
 Harold Faltermeyer – keyboards
 David Frank – keyboards
 Richard Tee – keyboards
 Marcus Miller – bass
 John Regan – bass
 Jocelyn Brown – backing vocals on "To Be a Lover"
 Connie Harvey – backing vocals on "To Be a Lover"
 Janet Wright – backing vocals on "To Be a Lover"

Production 
 Keith Forsey – producer
 Dave Concors – engineer
 Neil Dorfsman – engineer 
 Dave Wittman – engineer
 Debi Cornish – additional engineer
 Moira Marquis – additional engineer 
 Bill Miranda – additional engineer 
 Steve Tjaden – additional engineer 
 Gary Langan – mixing at The Hit Factory (New York, NY)
 Craig Vogel – mix assistant 
 George Marino – mastering at Sterling Sound (New York, NY)
 Bobby Deluca – production coordinator 
 Jon Dworkow – production coordinator 
 Artie Smith – production coordinator 
 Billy Idol – art direction, illustration 
 Frank Olinsky (Manhattan Design) – art direction, illustration 
 Pat Gorman (Manhattan Design) – art direction, illustration 
 Albert Sanchez – front cover photography
 Carolyn Greyshock – photography
 Herb Ritts – photography
 John Peden – photography
 Gary Allen – wardrobe stylist 
 Freddy Demann – management 
 Brigid Waters – management

Charts

Weekly charts

Year-end charts

Certifications

References

Bibliography

External links

1986 albums
Albums produced by Keith Forsey
Albums recorded at MSR Studios
Billy Idol albums
Chrysalis Records albums